Pontus Johansson (born September 22, 1991) is a Swedish professional ice hockey player who currently plays for Almtuna IS of the HockeyAllsvenskan

Johansson played one game for Timrå IK in the Elitserien during the 2010–11 Elitserien season.

References

External links

1991 births
IF Björklöven players
Living people
Sioux City Musketeers players
Swedish ice hockey right wingers
Timrå IK players
Sportspeople from Uppsala